Paolo Schiavo, the pseudonym of Paolo di Stefano Badaloni (1397-1478) was a Florentine painter.

Born in Florence, Paolo Schiavo enrolled in the Guild of Doctors and Apothecaries (Arte dei Medici e Speziali) in 1428. According to Vasari, he was a follower of Masolino. In 1435 he went to Castiglione Olona with Masolino where he realized the first section of the apse's right wall. Frescoes by Schiavo adorn the chapel on the left in the church of San Michele a Castellaccio di Sommaia, near Florence. Among his further dedications were frescoes of the Virgin and Child Enthroned with Saints for the church of San Miniato al Monte with an unusually pink pseudo-architectural framework (1436), The Crucifixion Adored by Nuns (1447-8), an Adoration of the Magi, and an Annunciation with various saints. He made several other works, all of which bear his signature and their corresponding dates. He died in Pisa.

References

External links

 

1397 births
1478 deaths
Quattrocento painters
Italian male painters
15th-century Italian painters
Painters from Florence
Fresco painters